was a Japanese samurai and commander of the Sengoku period. He was a senior retainer of the Mogami clan. He was also the castle lord in command of Sakenobe castle. In 1581, he surrendered when his Sakenobe castle was attacked by Mogami Yoshiaki and soon he became Yoshiaki's chief vassal.

During the Battle of Sekigahara, he participated in the Siege of Hasedō. He fought against Naoe Kanetsugu of the Western Army and showed a remarkable performance as a commander.

After Mogami clan was demolished by the Tokugawa Shogunate, he became a vassal of Doi Toshikatsu.

References

Samurai
1563 births
1646 deaths
Mogami clan
People from Yamagata Prefecture